"Like a Baby" is a song written by Jesse Stone. It was recorded by Vikki Nelson for a Vik Records single in 1957. Priscilla Bowman recorded it for Abner Records in 1959. It was also recorded by Elvis Presley for his 1960 album Elvis Is Back!. James Brown and the Famous Flames recorded the song and released it as a single in 1963, which charted No. 24 R&B. The single's B-side, an instrumental version of "Every Beat of My Heart", also charted, reaching No. 99 on the  Billboard Hot 100. Brown and the Flames performed "Like a Baby" on their 1964 live album Pure Dynamite! Live at the Royal.

Wanda Jackson recorded "Like a Baby" for her 2011 album The Party Ain't Over.

Glenn Danzig recorded the song for his 2020 album Danzig Sings Elvis.

This is not the song "Like a Baby" recorded by Len Barry (1965) and written by John Madara, David White and Len Barry.

Personnel (Elvis Presley version)
Sourced from Keith Flynn.
 Elvis Presley – lead vocals, acoustic rhythm/lead guitars
 Scotty Moore — electric guitar
 D. J. Fontana — drums
 Hank Garland – six-string bass guitar
 Bob Moore – double bass
 Floyd Cramer – piano
 Boots Randolph – saxophone
 Buddy Harman – drums
 The Jordanaires – backing vocals

References

Elvis Presley songs
James Brown songs
The Famous Flames songs
Wanda Jackson songs
Songs written by Jesse Stone
1960 songs
1963 singles
Song recordings produced by Chet Atkins
Song recordings produced by Stephen H. Sholes
King Records (United States) singles